Rodney Edwin Melland (May 20, 1938 – July 28, 2022) was an American curler,  and a 1971 United States men's curling champion.

Teams

Personal life
His younger brother Dennis is also a curler and Rodney's teammate.

References

External links
 

1938 births
2022 deaths
People from Devils Lake, North Dakota
People from Ramsey County, North Dakota
American male curlers
American curling champions